The 2009 FIBA Africa Under-16 Championship for Men (alternatively the Afrobasket U16) was the 1st U-16 FIBA Africa championship, played under the auspices of the Fédération Internationale de Basketball, the basketball sport governing body and qualified for the 2010 World Cup. The tournament was held from September 19–26 in Maputo, Mozambique, contested by 9 national teams and won by Egypt.

The tournament qualified the winner for the 2010 U17 World Championship.

Squads

Format
The 9 teams were divided into two groups (Groups A+B) for the preliminary round.
Round robin for the preliminary round; the top four teams advanced to the quarterfinals.
From there on a knockout system was used until the final.

Draw

Preliminary round
Times given below are in UTC+2.

Group A

Group B
Guinea was disqualified due to age fraud

Knockout stage 
All matches were played in: Pavilhão do Maxaquene, Maputo

5th place bracket

Quarterfinals

Seventh place game

Fifth place game

Semifinals

Bronze medal game

Gold medal game

Final standings

Egypt rosterAhmed Gamal, Ahmed Hamdy, Ahmed Karoura, Ahmed Mostafa, Assem Gindy, Khaled Moftan, Mostafa Abousamra, Moustafa Ghazi, Omar Mohamed, Omar Yasser, Seif Samir, Youssef Shousha, Coach: Hesham Aboserea

Awards

All-Tournament Team

 G Mohamed Guermat
 PG Ahmed Mostafa MVP
 F Boubacar Moungoro
 PF René Manusse
 C Khaled Moftan

Statistical Leaders

Individual Tournament Highs

Points

Rebounds

Assists

Steals

Blocks

Minutes

Individual Game Highs

Team Tournament Highs

Points per Game

Total Points

Rebounds

Assists

Steals

Blocks

2-point field goal percentage

3-point field goal percentage

Free throw percentage

Team Game highs

See also
 2010 FIBA Africa Under-18 Championship

External links
Official Website

References

2009 FIBA Africa Under-16 Championship for Men
2009 FIBA Africa Under-16 Championship for Men
FIBA Africa Under-16 Championship for Men
International basketball competitions hosted by Mozambique